Solon Hannibal de la Mothe Borglum (December 22, 1868 – January 31, 1922) was an American sculptor. He is most noted for his depiction of frontier life, and especially his experience with cowboys and native Americans.

He was awarded the Croix de Guerre by France for his work with Les Foyers du Soldat service clubs during World War I.

Early life

Born in Ogden, Utah, Borglum was the younger brother of Gutzon Borglum and uncle of Lincoln Borglum, the two men most responsible for the creation of the carvings at Mount Rushmore.  Solon's Danish immigrant father James Borglum was a Mormon polygamist, being married to two sisters, Ida and Christina Michelson.  When the family – each wife had two children – moved to Nebraska they could no longer openly be husband and wives, so Solon and Gutzon's mother Christina was listed as the family servant.  When the father moved the family again to St. Louis in 1871, so that he could attend medical school, the decision was made to leave Christina behind. The children were told to never talk about her again. Solon was about three years old at the time.  Solon grew up in  Fremont, Nebraska and Omaha and spent his early years as a rancher in western Nebraska.

Solon’s father was a physician but had worked as a wood-carver, which almost certainly influenced Solon’s older brother, Gutzon, to pursue a career as an artist. Having shown little interest in formal schooling, the younger son spent his teens working on his father’s ranch near Fremont, Nebraska. He showed a talent for drawing horses, and his careful studies of their movements prompted Gutzon to encourage Solon to pursue art as a profession.

Education
In 1893 Solon went to Omaha to study with J. Laurie Wallace, a former pupil of Thomas Eakins. Following this early, and evidently brief, formal training, he joined his brother Gutzon at his home in the Sierra Madre mountains. A personality clash with Gutzon’s first wife Lisa however, forced Solon to move on; he went to Los Angeles, where he painted portraits and to Santa Ana, California, where he taught art privately. He had little success, however, and in November 1895 he traveled to Cincinnati, Ohio, where he entered the Cincinnati Art Academy. One of his instructors, the sculptor Louis Rebisso, encouraged him to try sculpting. His first effort was a sculpture of a group of horses based on observations and drawings he had made at the U.S. Mail stables in Cincinnati.

In 1898 the Art Academy awarded Borglum a scholarship that allowed him to go to Paris, where he matriculated at the Académie Julian as a student of Denys Puech. He met leading sculptors Emmanuel Fremiet and Augustus Saint-Gaudens, who gave him further encouragement. Borglum received a silver medal at the Exposition Universelle (1900) and another at the Pan-American Exposition in Buffalo, NY

Later life
Borglum moved to the Silvermine neighborhood of New Canaan, Connecticut, where he helped found the "Knockers Club" of artists. His brother, Gutzon, lived in nearby Stamford, Connecticut from 1910 to 1920.

Borglum married in 1898, and he and his wife, Emma, spent the summer of 1899 at the Crow Creek Reservation in South Dakota. Though he later lived in Paris and New York City and achieved a reputation as one of America's notable sculptors, it was his depictions of frontier life, and especially his experience with cowboys and Native American peoples, which was the basis of his reputation. In 1911, Borglum was elected into the National Academy of Design as an Associate member.

In 1920, he established the American School of Sculpture in New York City. and ran the school and gave many lectures on art until his death after an appendectomy complicated by his war wounds  in January 1922. His legacy was carried on by his wife Emma until her death in 1934, at which point his daughter Monica and her husband, A. Mervyn Davies, oversaw the exhibition of his artwork. In 1974 they published his biography Solon H. Borglum: A Man Who Stands Alone.

Borglum's papers are held at the Archives of American Art, and the Library of Congress.

Works
Borglum created several animal groups while in Paris, including Lassoing Wild Horses and The Stampede of Wild Horses, which were shown at the Paris Salon in 1898 and 1899, respectively.

The year 1903 was a banner one for the artist. He had a one-man show of thirty-two small sculptures at the Keppel Gallery, New York. In his ground-breaking History of American Sculpture published that year, Lorado Taft devoted several pages to Borglum, and he was the subject of an entire chapter in Charles Caffin’s 1903 book American Masters of Sculpture. In 1904 Borglum won the gold medal at the Louisiana Purchase Exposition held in St. Louis.

Borglum received several major public commissions, including an equestrian monument of General John Brown Gordon for the grounds of the Georgia State Capitol in Atlanta (1907), one of Rough Rider Buckey O'Neill for the plaza in front of the courthouse in Prescott, Arizona (1907), and The Pioneer, which was erected in the Court of Honor at the Panama–Pacific International Exposition in San Francisco (1915).

Two of his works are located in Jersey City, New Jersey.  His sculpture Buffalo and Bears is in Leonard Gordon Park in the city's Heights section

In 1974 a group of the sculptor's descendants gave twenty bronzes, marbles, original plasters, portfolios of drawings and paintings to the New Britain Museum of American Art. Today the Museum houses the largest repository of Borglum's works.

Borglum sculpted a larger than life bronze equestrian statue for the Bucky O'Neill Monument, Rough Rider at the Yavapai County Court House Plaza in Prescott, Arizona. Teddy Roosevelt had persuaded Buckey O'Neill to join the Rough Riders and he was killed at the Battle of San Juan Hill. Borglum's statue Cowboy at Rest is also located on the grounds of the Yavapai County Court House in  Prescott, Arizona.

Borglum's pieces can be found at the Buffalo Bill Museum in Cody, Wyoming, including Evening, a depiction of a cowboy leaning against his unsaddled horse at the end of the day.

Two of Borglum's sculptures, Inspiration and Aspiration, which depict Native American men, stand in the front courtyard of St. Mark's Church in-the-Bowery, in the East Village neighborhood of Manhattan in New York City, flanking the front gate.

Black and white photos of Cowboy Mounting, Lost in a Blizzard (in marble), and Tamed can be found in Caffin's book.

List of works

Atlanta, Georgia – John Brown Gordon statue
Brooklyn, New York, –
Brooklyn Museum – Charles A. Schieren  
Truman J. Backus Memorial
Danbury, Connecticut – Taps
Lynchburg, Virginia – Private Jones
Jersey City, New Jersey – Buffalo and Bears
New Britain, Connecticut, –
New Britain Museum of American Art, –
One in a Thousand   
Our Slave   
Bear on Haunches   
Bear with Raised Head   
Bear   
Just Born   
Burial on the Plains   
Blizzard   
The Waters   
The Indian (A Study)   
Indian Chase Love   
God's Command   
The Heavens   
Paul   
Monica   
Cowboy at Rest   
Pioneer in a Storm   
Sioux Indian Buffalo Dance   
Benjamin Franklin   
Jacob Leisler   
Baby Edith   
In the Wind  

New Rochelle, New York – Jacob Leisler monument
New York City, New York – Bates Tablet
Phoenix, Arizona – Michael Glen Cunniff
Portland, Oregon – Major William Clark
Prescott, Arizona – Captain William O'Neill
Topeka, Kansas – James Edwin Hurley
Vicksburg, Mississippi – 
John Gregg
Francis J. Herron
Joseph A. Mower
Giles A. SmithWilliam S. SmithEdward D. TracyWashington, D.C. –
Pan-American Union Building – Condor and EagleHamilton HamiltonSimon NewcombThomas P. OchiltreeReferences
Notes

Bibliography

Davies, A. Mervyn  (1974). Solon H. Borglum: "A Man Who Stands Alone" (Chester, Connecticut: Pequot Press) 
Dearinger, David B. (1999). New Britain Museum of American Art: Highlights of the Collection I (Prestel Verlag) 

Further reading
Armstrong, Tom  (1976). 200 Years of American Sculpture. Boston: D.R. Godine. 
Aronowitz,  Marguerite Madison  (2001) Art Treasures and Museums In and Around Prescott, Arizona. Pine Castle Books. 
Craven, Wayne  (1968). Sculpture in America''. New York: Thomas Y. Crowell.

External links

 A finding aid to the Solon H. Borglum and Borglum family papers, 1864-2002 at the Archives of American Art, Smithsonian Institution
 A finding aid to the Harriet Collins Allen papers relating to Solon Borglum, 1897-1925, at the Archives of American Art, Smithsonian Institution
 Solon Hannibal Borglum papers at the Library of Congress
 Solon H. Borglum bibliography at the University of Utah
 Solon H. Borglum at ArtCyclopedia
 Solon Hannibal Borglum at AskArt

1868 births
1922 deaths
Artists of the American West
Sculptors from Connecticut
Artists from Nebraska
Sculptors from Utah
American people of Danish descent
Artists from Ogden, Utah
Monumental masons
20th-century American sculptors
20th-century American male artists
19th-century American sculptors
19th-century American male artists
American male sculptors
Recipients of the Croix de Guerre 1914–1918 (France)
Students of Thomas Eakins